At Close Quarters may refer to:

 At Close Quarters, a 2007 crime novel by Eugenio Fuentes
 At Close Quarters, a 1987 spy novel by Gerald Seymour